The jolthead porgy (Calamus bajonado) is an ocean-going species of fish in the family Sparidae. In Bermuda, it is known as the blue bone porgy, in the United States, it is also known by the Spanish name bojanado, in Jamaica, it is one of the species known by the name, porgi grunt.

Taxonomy and naming

Credit for describing the Jolthead porgy goes to Marcus Elieser Bloch and Johann Gottlob Schneider. Though Bloch died in 1799, Schneider edited and republished several of Bloch's papers in a book called Systema Ichthyologiae iconibus cx illustratum in 1801. It was originally placed in the genus Sparus, which now contains only one species, but has since been moved into Calamus. The  Genus name comes from the mythological Calamus, or Kalamos. It was so named because the Calamus of myth allowed himself to drown in a river, after the death of his lover, and transform into aquatic plants that some members of the genus make their homes in. The species name, bojonado, comes from the Spanish words bojo and nado, which mean "low swimming". Its common name is thought to come from its feeding behavior- that Jolthead porgies feed by jolting mollusks from rocks.

The Jolthead porgy has five known synonyms, placing it in the genera Pagrus, Pagellus, Sparus, and Calamus. The holotypes of Calamus macrops, and C. plumatula were reviewed in 1966 and found to be synonyms. Sparus bojanado is a senior synonym, it was the name originally given by Bloch and Schneider, but is no longer the accepted name.

Description 
The Jolthead porgy usually has 12 rays on the dorsal fin, 10 on the anal fin. They have 15 pectoral rays, though they can sometimes vary from 14 to 16. The lateral line can have from 50 to 57 scales. It differs from similar poriges it that most members of the genus has 45–49 scales on their lateral lines. It also differs from Calamus pennatula in that it has more pectoral rays. Jolthead porgies have a blue line under each eye, and their mouths are rimmed in orange. The fish's overall color is a brassy silver with occasional blue/green iridescence, making it one of the dullest-colored member of its genus.

The largest recorded Jolthead porgy was 76 cm, while they commonly grow up to 54 cm. Though they normally grow to around 8 lb, The heaviest weighed 23.36 lb.

Distribution and habitat 
Known only from the western Atlantic Ocean, Jolthead porgies are found from Rhode Island and Bermuda south to Brazil. They are abundant in the northern Gulf of Mexico and the West Indies. They have been collected from beds of seagrass, and commonly swim in clear, shallow water up to 150 feet, (though there have been reports of them as deep as 180 and 200 m) where they are normally solitary, but sometimes appear in schools near reefs. They are thought to spawn in July and August.

There is some debate over the Jolthead porgy's diet. Some sources consider it omnivorous, while others state at its eats mainly other animals such as sea urchins (especially of the genus Diadema), Mollusks and Crustaceans.

Relationship with humans 
Considered to be an excellent food fish, Jolt head porgies can easily be caught with a hook and line on the bottom and by means of fish traps. They are considered to be a game fish and are of minor commercial importance, though there have been reports of ciguatera poisoning due to red tide associated with them.

References

External links
 

jolthead porgy
Fish of the Eastern United States
Fish of the Western Atlantic
jolthead porgy
Fish of Cuba
Fish of the Dominican Republic